The Porkeri Mountains are a mountain range near the village of Porkeri in the Faroe Islands near the Porkeri Mountains, just north of Vágur on Suðuroy's east coast.

Mountains of the Faroe Islands